Kim Jae-kyung (born December 24, 1988), formerly known mononymously as Jaekyung, is a South Korean actress and singer. Before transitioning to acting full-time, she was a member and leader of the South Korean girl group Rainbow.

Early life and education
Kim was born in Seodaemun-gu, Seoul, South Korea on December 24, 1988. She studied at Deungchon High School and Dongduk Women's University, where she majored in Fashion Design. Her brother is N.Flying's Jaehyun.

Career

Pre-debut
She was a trainee at JYP Entertainment before switching to DSP Media. While under DSP Media, in 2007 she was asked if she wanted to debut as a member of Kara. Kim turned the offer down because she thought she would be happy with her Rainbow members. In 2007, she was asked to join SM Entertainment, hinting at the possibility that she may have joined Girls' Generation. In 2008, she appeared in SS501's song "A Song Calling For You" music video before debuting as a Rainbow member.

2009–2016: Rainbow, Rainbow Blaxx, solo activities 

Kim debuted as leader of girl group Rainbow on November 12, 2009, with the release of mini album Gossip Girl. The group's first broadcast performance of "Gossip Girls" was held at MBC's music show Show! Music Core on November 14, 2009.

In 2010, she became a cast member in the variety television show Honey Jar. That same year, she also became a cast member in the school variety show 100 Points Out of 100.

On March 31, 2012, Kim had her first leading role as Na Yoo-mi in the JTBC's drama Monster. Later that year, she became a cast member in the variety television show Law of the Jungle W.

In December 2013, she was confirmed for tvN's new reality program, The Genius: Rule Breaker, with 12 other representative figures from different fields of work such as TV personalities, politicians, gamblers, and more. She was the second person eliminated.

Jaekyung, Woori, Seungah, and Hyunyoung debuted as Rainbow Blaxx, the second official sub-unit of Rainbow, in 2014. The group released their first mini album titled RB Blaxx on January 20, 2014.

Kim was cast in a supporting role in the 2014 drama Inspiring Generation. In 2014, she was also part of the main cast in Quiz of God 4. On January 12, 2014, she was a guest on Running Man. 

In 2015, she entered the main cast of tvN's Always Cantare 2. She also starred in Noble, My Love as Cha Yoon-seo, a veterinarian who runs her own animal hospital, across from Sung Hoon.

In 2016, she became a host on Beauty Bible, alongside Jessica Jung. 

On October 27, 2016, it was confirmed that Rainbow would be disbanding following the expiration of the members' contracts. In December 2016, Kim signed with new management agency Namoo Actors to start afresh as an actress.

2017–present: Acting 
In 2018, Kim was cast in Life on Mars as Han Mal-sook. Later that year she appeared as part of the main cast in Bad Papa as Cha Ji-woo, the youngest female lieutenant. 

In 2019, Kim appeared as Veronica Park, the CEO of a film production company and an heiress with an audacious personality, in The Secret Life of My Secretary. This led to her being nominated for Best Supporting Actress at the 2019 SBS Drama Awards. 

In 2021, Kim appeared in The Devil Judge as Oh Jin-joo, an associate judge who idolizes Yo-han (Ji Sung). 

In 2022, Kim appeared as Kim Han-mi, a former delinquent and current reporter who assists Hee-woo (Lee Joon-gi) against corrupt officials, in Again My Life.

Discography

Soundtrack appearances

Filmography

Films

Television series

Web series

Television shows

Awards and nominations

References

External links

 Official website 

1988 births
Living people
People from Seoul
Actors from Seoul
Singers from Seoul
K-pop singers
South Korean female idols
South Korean women pop singers
South Korean dance musicians
South Korean television actresses
South Korean television personalities
South Korean web series actresses
Rainbow (girl group)
DSP Media artists